Thoreauella is a monotypic genus of wasps belonging to the family Figitidae. The only species is Thoreauella amatrix.

References

Figitidae
Monotypic Hymenoptera genera